St. Mary's is the parish church of Cubbington, Warwickshire, England. Denominationally it is part of the Church of England.

The original church building was constructed in the early 12th century with many alterations taking place since. The building is Grade I listed.

Cubbington, St. Mary's Church
Grade I listed churches in Warwickshire